The bluish-grey saltator or  blue-gray saltator (Saltator coerulescens) is a passerine bird in the tanager family Thraupidae that is widespread in the tropical Americas.

Taxonomy
The bluish-grey saltator was formally described in 1817 by the French ornithologist Louis Jean Pierre Vieillot under the binomial name Saltator coerulescens. Vieillot based his description on the "Habia de la Ceja Blanca" that Félix de Azara had described in 1802 in his book on birds in Paraguay and the Río de la Plata. The specific epithet coerulescens is derived from Latin and means "bluish". The cinnamon-bellied (Saltator grandis) and olive-grey saltators (Saltator olivascens) were previously considered subspecies, together known as the greyish saltator.

Description
On average, the bluish-grey saltator is 20 cm long and weighs 52 g. The plumage depends on age and subspecies, but in general this bird has grey or greyish-olive upperparts, a white stripe over the eye, a narrow white throat, a grey breast and a buff or cinnamon belly.

The common call is a long-drawn upward slur, ch'wheeet or ch'kweeee, sometimes with a more elaborate beginning, as hi'whee chu weeeeh. The song is a warble, usually fairly short, varying from nasal to mellow.

Distribution and habitat
This species occurs in open woodland, plains and scrub, in Bolivia, Brazil, Paraguay, Argentina, and Uruguay.

Behaviour and ecology
The bluish-grey saltator feeds on fruits, buds and slow-moving arthropods. It forages at low and middle levels, sometimes in pairs or small groups and sometimes with mixed-species flocks that may include other saltators.

The two pale blue subelliptic eggs per clutch measure some 23–31.5 mm long by about 17–22 mm wide and weigh about 5 grams each.  They look unusual for this genus as they have a circle of blackish-brown hairstreaks and dots around the blunt end. They are laid in a bulky cup nest 2–4 m high in a tree.

References

Further reading
 Bencke, Glayson Ariel (2007): Avifauna atual do Rio Grande do Sul, Brasil: aspectos biogeográficos e distribucionais ["The Recent avifauna of Rio Grande do Sul: Biogeographical and distributional aspects"]. Talk held on 2007-JUN-22 at Quaternário do RS: integrando conhecimento, Canoas, Rio Grande do Sul, Brazil. PDF abstract
 Echeverry-Galvis, María Ángela & Córdoba-Córdoba, Sergio (2006): Descripción del huevo del saltátor collarejo (Saltator cinctus) y comentarios preliminares sobre huevos del género Saltator. ["Description of the egg of the Masked Saltator (S. cinctus) and preliminary comments on the eggs of the genus Saltator"]. Boletín de la Sociedad Antioqueña de Ornitología 16(1): 76–84. [Spanish with English abstract] PDF fulltext
 ffrench, Richard; O'Neill, John Patton & Eckelberry, Don R. (1991): A guide to the birds of Trinidad and Tobago (2nd edition). Comstock Publishing, Ithaca, N.Y.. 
 Foster, Mercedes S. (2007): The potential of fruiting trees to enhance converted habitats for migrating birds in southern Mexico. Bird Conservation International 17(1): 45–61.  PDF fulltext
 Hilty, Steven L. (2003): Birds of Venezuela. Christopher Helm, London. 
 Howell, Steven N. G. & Webb, Sophie (1995): A Guide to the Birds of Mexico and Northern Central America. Oxford University Press, Oxford & New York. 
 Stiles, F. Gary & Skutch, Alexander Frank (1989): A guide to the birds of Costa Rica. Comistock, Ithaca.

External links

Photograph from the Salvadoran Ministry of the Environment and Natural Resources
Bird song display list with .wav file of call
Grayish Saltator videos, photos & sounds on the Internet Bird Collection
"Grayish Saltator" photo gallery VIREO Photo-High Res--(Close-up)
"Grayish Saltator" photos from Suriname

Saltator
Birds of South America
Birds of the Amazon Basin
Birds of Brazil
Birds described in 1817
Taxa named by Louis Jean Pierre Vieillot